The 2012 Nielsen Pro Tennis Championship was a professional tennis tournament played on hard courts. It was the 21st edition of the tournament which was part of the 2012 ATP Challenger Tour. It took place in Winnetka, Illinois, between 2 and 8 July 2012.

Singles main-draw entrants

Seeds

 1 Rankings are as of June 25, 2012.

Other entrants
The following players received wildcards into the singles main draw:
  Mitchell Frank
  Bradley Klahn
  Dennis Nevolo
  Blake Strode

The following players received entry as an alternate into the singles main draw:
  Ričardas Berankis

The following players received entry from the qualifying draw:
  Jeff Dadamo
  Luka Gregorc
  Ante Pavić
  John-Patrick Smith

Champions

Singles

 John-Patrick Smith def.  Ričardas Berankis, 3–6, 6–3, 7–6(7–3)

Doubles

 Devin Britton /  Jeff Dadamo def.  John Peers /  John-Patrick Smith, 1–6, 6–2, [10–6]

External links
Official website

Nielsen Pro Tennis Championship
Nielsen Pro Tennis Championship
Niel
Nielsen Pro Tennis Championship
Nielsen Pro Tennis Championship